Kakooza Nkuliza Charles (born 3 December 1982), professionally known as KNC, is a Rwandan media personality and executive.  He is the CEO and founder of Radio 1 Rwanda, TV1 Rwanda, and  Gasogi United Football Club.

Background 
Charles went to high school at College Saint Andre (Nyamirambo) around 2000. Later, he received short courses on media production in Uganda and then started working as a radio presenter and production manager at Flash FM (2004-2006). In 2006, he moved to a new radio station named City Radio  (2006-2008), where he received audience attention for his shows, advertisements, and cinematic records.

Business career 
In 2012, Charles started his business by selling solar energy equipment, before going on to launch Radio 1 Rwanda in the same year. Charles opened TV1 Rwanda in 2014 and he founded Gasogi United in 2016.

Entertainment career 
While Charles worked in CITY Radio, he wrote, edited and presented a popular cinematic audio series called Doctor Runiga (Papa Runiga). Charles was also a CEO and producer at A to Z Production, where he worked with Jay Polly, The Ben, Meddy, Riderman, and others. Charles also released songs like "Heart Desire" in 2017 and "Impamvu" in 2018, the same year which he organized and performed "Legend is Alive" in Kigali with Yvonne Chaka Chaka, Alyn Sano, and Bruce Melodie.

References

External links 
 

Living people
1992 births